The catalogue of Edward Plunkett, 18th Baron of Dunsany (Lord Dunsany)'s work during his 53-year active writing career is quite extensive, and is fraught with pitfalls for two reasons: first, many of Dunsany's original books of collected short stories were later followed by reprint collections, some of which were unauthorised and included only previously published stories; and second, some later collections bore titles very similar to different original books.

In 1993, S. T. Joshi and Darrell Schweitzer released a bibliographic volume which, while emphasising that it makes no claim to be the final word, gives considerable information on Dunsany's work. They noted that a "ledger" of at least some of Dunsany's work was thought to have existed at Dunsany Castle.  The Dunsany family has had a curator, Joe Doyle, since the 1990s, who gathered materials by Dunsany and Francis Ledwidge at Dunsany Castle, compiled writing and publication data, and unearthed works such as the Last Book of Jorkens and some "loose" Jorkens stories, plays including The Ginger Cat, and a set of short stories, some published in a 2017 collection, as well as supplying material for the Lost Tales series.

The following is a partial list compiled from various sources.

Short-story collections

Original

Miscellaneous
 The Gods of Pegāna (1905)
 Time and the Gods (1906)
 The Sword of Welleran and Other Stories (1908)
 A Dreamer's Tales (1910)
 The Book of Wonder (1912)
 Fifty-One Tales, aka The Food of Death (1915)
 Tales of Wonder (1916) (published in the United States as The Last Book of Wonder)
 Tales of War (1918) 
 Unhappy Far-Off Things (1919)
 Tales of Three Hemispheres (U.S. 1919, UK 1920)
 The Man Who Ate the Phoenix (1949)
 The Little Tales of Smethers and Other Stories (1952), including the Linley crime/mystery tales

Jorkens
 The Travel Tales of Mr. Joseph Jorkens (1931)
 Jorkens Remembers Africa  (1934)
 Jorkens Has a Large Whiskey (1940)
 The Fourth Book of Jorkens (1947)
 Jorkens Borrows Another Whiskey (1954)
 The Last Book of Jorkens (2002), prepared for publication in 1957

The Jorkens books were released in a 3-volume omnibus set in 2004–2005, with some added material:
 The Collected Jorkens, Volume One (April 2004), the first two books of Jorkens
 The Collected Jorkens, Volume Two (2004), the second two Jorkens books, plus two uncollected stories, one not previously published 
 The Collected Jorkens, Volume Three (April 2005), the last two Jorkens books, plus three uncollected stories, at least one not previously published

Reprint collections
 Selections from the Writings of Lord Dunsany (1912, edited by W.B. Yeats)
 A Dreamer's Tales and Other Stories (1917; collects A Dreamer's Tales and The Sword of Welleran, unauthorised)
 Book of Wonder (1918; collects The Book of Wonder and Time and the Gods, unauthorised)
 The Sword of Welleran and Other Tales of Enchantment (1954), selected by Lord and Lady Dunsany as a sampling of works to date

Posthumous collections
 At the Edge of the World (1970)
 Beyond the Fields We Know (1972)
 Gods, Men and Ghosts (1972), including short stories, essays
 Over the Hills and Far Away (1974)
 The Ghosts of the Heaviside Layer, and Other Fantasms (1980), a posthumous gathering of uncollected stories, essays and two plays
 Bethmoora and Other Stories (1993) 
 The Exiles Club and Other Stories (1993) 
 The Lands of Wonder (1994) 
 The Hashish Man and Other Stories (1996)
 The Complete Pegana (1998)
 Time and the Gods (2000)
 In the Land of Time, and Other Fantasy Tales (March 2004), a Penguin Classics volume
 Lost Tales, Volume 1 (2012) Previously uncollected short stories appearing in magazines between 1909–1915.
 Lost Tales, Volume 2: The Emperor's Crystal & Other Lost Tales (2013) Previously uncollected short stories appearing in magazines and newspapers between 1915-1920 and a previously unpublished story from 1909.
 Lost Tales, Volume 3 (2014) Previously uncollected short stories appearing in magazines and newspapers between 1910-1954 and three previously unpublished stories.
 The Men of Baldfolk & Other Fanciful Tales (2016) Five previously unpublished stories and four uncollected stories ranging from 1908 to 1955.
 The Ghost in the Corner and Other Stories (2017) 50 uncollected and previously unpublished stories.
 A Dreamer's Tales: Annotated Edition  (2018) Annotated collection of stories
 Lost Tales, Volume 4 (2018) Eight previously unpublished stories and one uncollected story ranging from 1909 to 1956.
 Lost Tales, Volume 5 (2020) Six previously unpublished stories, two uncollected stories, one poem, and one story published in The Ghost in the Corner, ranging from 1914 to 1953.

Novels

Fantasy
 Don Rodriguez: Chronicles of Shadow Valley aka The Chronicles of Rodriguez (1922)
 The King of Elfland's Daughter (1924)
 The Charwoman's Shadow (1926), second part of the Shadow Valley Chronicles
 The Blessing of Pan (1927, see also Pan)
 The Curse of the Wise Woman (1933)
 My Talks With Dean Spanley (1936)
 The Strange Journeys of Colonel Polders (1950)

Science fiction
 The Last Revolution (1951)
 The Pleasures of a Futuroscope (2003) (posthumous novel dating from the mid-1950s; on a topic first introduced in a Jorkens story)

Non-science fiction or fantasy
 Up in the Hills (1935)
 Rory and Bran (1936)
 The Story of Mona Sheehy (1939)
 Guerilla (1944)
 His Fellow Men (1952)

Plays
 Most of Dunsany's early plays were issued in individual editions by Samuel French and were freely available, though mostly for the acting and production markets.

Collections
 Five Plays (1914)
"The Gods of the Mountain"
"The Golden Doom"
"King Argimenes and the Unknown Warrior"
"The Glittering Gate"
"The Lost Silk Hat"
 A Night at an Inn (full-length play) (1916)
 Plays of Gods and Men (1917)
"The Laughter of the Gods" 
"The Queen's Enemies"
"The Tents of the Arabs" 
"A Night at an Inn" (as above)
 If (full-length play) (1921)
 Plays of Near and Far (1922)
"The Compromise of the King of the Golden Isles"
"The Flight of the Queen"
"Cheezo"
"A Good Bargain"
"If Shakespeare Lived Today"
"Fame and the Poet"
 Alexander and Three Small Plays (1925)
"Alexander"
"The Old King's Tale"
"The Evil Kettle"
"The Amusements of Khan Kharuda"
 Seven Modern Comedies (1928)
"Atalanta in Wimbledon"
"The Raffle"
"The Journey of the Soul"
"In Holy Russia"
"His Sainted Grandmother"
"The Hopeless Passion of Mr Bunyon"
"The Jest of Hahalaba"
 The Old Folk of the Centuries (full-length play) (1930)
 Mr Faithful (full-length play) (1935)
 Plays for Earth and Air (1937), plays written for and produced on radio, notably BBC Light and the World Service
"Fame Comes Late"
"A Matter of Honour"
"Mr Sliggen's Hour"
"The Pumpkin"
"The Use of Man"
"The Bureau de Change"
"The Seventh Symphony"
"Golden Dragon City"
"Time's Joke"
"Atmospherics"
 The Ghosts of the Heaviside Layer, and Other Fantasms (1980), a posthumous gathering of uncollected stories, essays and two plays
"The Prince of Stamboul" (1925)
"Lord Adrian" (1933)
 The Ginger Cat and Other Lost Plays (2005), plays known to have existed, and in at least one case acted, but only unearthed in the 2000s
"The Ginger Cat" (1914)
"The Murderers" (1919)
"Mr Faithful" (1922)

Poetry collections
 Fifty Poems (1929)
 Mirage Water (1938)
 War Poems (1941) (extensive notes to each poem posted in review of the book at Amazon.co.uk)
 Wandering Songs (1943)
 A Journey (1944)
 The Year (1946)
 The Odes of Horace (1947) (translation)
 To Awaken Pegasus (1949)
 Verses Dedicatory: 18 Previously Unpublished Poems (1985)

Nonfiction

Essay collections
 Gods, Men and Ghosts (1972), including short stories, essays
 The Ghosts of the Heaviside Layer, and Other Fantasms (1980), a posthumous gathering of uncollected stories, essays and two plays

Essays
 Nowadays (1918), a single long essay
 If I Were Dictator (1934), a long satirical essay, one of a series by well-known figures of the period
 The Donnellan Lectures 1943 (1945), lectures given at Trinity College Dublin by Dunsany
 A Glimpse from a Watchtower (1947), a long essay musing on the future in a nuclear era

Geography/history
 My Ireland (1937), a non-fiction look at Ireland and her landscape and heritage, with photos

Autobiography
 Patches of Sunlight (1938)
 While The Sirens Slept (1944)
 The Sirens Wake (1945)

Letters
 Arthur C. Clarke & Lord Dunsany: A Correspondence 1945–1956. ed. Keith Allen Daniels. Palo Alto, CA, USA: Anamnesis Press, 1998, a posthumous collection with the cooperation of the Dunsany Estate and Arthur C. Clarke.

Books in print

Millennium Fantasy Masterworks
 Time and the Gods (contains The Gods of Pegāna, Time and the Gods, The Sword of Welleran and Other Stories, A Dreamer's Tales, The Book of Wonder and The Last Book of Wonder, without the Sime illustrations and with Pegāna out of order)
 The King of Elfland's Daughter

Penguin Classics
 In the Land of Time: and Other Fantasy Tales

Del Rey Books
The King of Elfland's Daughter
The Charwoman's Shadow

Hippocampus Press
The Pleasures of a Futuroscope
The Ghost in the Corner and Other Stories

Wildside Press
 The Gods of Pegāna  
 Time and the Gods  
 The Book of Wonder  
 A Dreamer's Tales
 Fifty-One Tales
 Tales of War: Expanded Edition 
 Unhappy Far-Off Things 
 Don Rodriguez: Chronicles of Shadow Valley
 Plays of Gods and Men  
 The Ginger Cat and Other Lost Plays

Forgotten classics
The Dreams of a Prophet (hardcover, with large print edition also available via the Lulu.com website; contains the collections The Gods of Pegana, Time and the Gods, The Sword of Welleran, and Fifty-One Tales)

Pegana Press
Lost Tales Volume 1
The Emperor's Crystal & Other Lost Tales Volume 2
Lost Tales, Volume 3
The Men of Baldfolk & Other Fanciful Tales
Lost Tales, Volume 4
Lost Tales, Volume 5

Valancourt Books
 The Curse of the Wise Woman with an introduction by Mark Valentine.

References

Bibliographies by writer
Bibliographies of British writers
Fantasy bibliographies
Dramatist and playwright bibliographies